Harold Cecil Bray (5 July 1920 – 27 June 1999) was an Australian rules footballer who played with St Kilda in the Victorian Football League (VFL). 

Bray was recruited to the Saints from Prahran in 1941 and for the next ten years served the club with distinction as a pacy centreman. 

He fell two votes shy of winning the Brownlow Medal in his final season, 1952, after finishing third in 1949 and second in 1947. 

He did, however, twice win St.Kilda's best and fairest award in 1945 and 1947 and also represented the VFL in interstate football.

Personal life
Bray served as a private in the Australian Army during the Second World War.

References

External links

1920 births
1999 deaths
Trevor Barker Award winners
Australian rules footballers from Melbourne
St Kilda Football Club players
Prahran Football Club players
Australian Army personnel of World War II
Australian Army soldiers
Military personnel from Melbourne